St Lawrence railway station is located on the North Coast line in Queensland, Australia. It serves the town of St Lawrence. Opposite the single platform lie two crossing loops.

Services
St Lawrence is served by Traveltrain's Spirit of Queensland service.

References

External links

St Lawrence station Queensland's Railways on the Internet

Central Queensland
Regional railway stations in Queensland
North Coast railway line, Queensland